Carla Campra (born 1999) is a Spanish actress. She earned early public recognition for her role in 90-60-90, diario secreto de una adolescente.

Biography 
Born in 1999 in Barcelona, she moved years later to Boadilla del Monte with her family. She has an older brother, Guillermo, also dedicated to acting.

Her feature film debut came with her performance in the 2007 drama , whereas she had her television debut in 2008 with a minor performance in the series . She performed in more than 40 episodes of the TV series Yo soy Bea, playing the young Paloma, and she also landed a main cast role in the series 90-60-90, Diario secreto de una adolescente, which advanced her acting career. Guest appearances in series such as El secreto de Puente Viejo,  and  ensued. Campra also performed in La otra mirada and Señoras del (H)AMPA. Besides a starring role in the second part of the TV movie La duquesa as Eugenia Martínez de Irujo, her film credits include performances in the children's film El sueño de Iván, Verónica and Everybody Knows, in which she played the daughter of Penélope Cruz's character.

In 2020, Campra joined the cast of the daily soap opera Acacias 38 to play Daniela, later joining the production of the Netflix fantasy thriller series Feria.

Filmography 

Television

Film

References 

21st-century Spanish actresses
Spanish child actresses
1999 births
Spanish television actresses
Spanish film actresses
Actresses from Barcelona
Living people